Recruitment and Placement of Seafarers Convention, 1996 is  an International Labour Organization Convention.

It was established in 1996, with the preamble stating:
Recalling the entry into force of the United Nations Convention on the Law of the Sea, 1982, on 16 November 1994, and

Having decided upon the adoption of certain proposals with regard to the revision of the Placing of Seamen Convention, 1920, ..

Ratifications
As of 2022, the convention had been ratified by 10 states. However, all have subsequently denounced it.

Recruitment and Placement of Seafarers Convention and COVID-19
The International Labour Organisation (ILO), taking into account the Recruitment and Placement of Seafarers Convention, called on governments to immediately adopt possible measures in the interests of seafarers and to take steps to minimize the risk of COVID-19 virus infection.
The ILO Memorandum sought to coordinate the International Maritime Organisation (IMO) and World Health Organization(WHO) action strategies to prevent the spread of COVID-19.

External links 
Text.
Ratifications.

References

International Labour Organization conventions
Treaties concluded in 1996
Treaties entered into force in 2000
Treaties of Ireland
Treaties of Nigeria
Admiralty law treaties
1996 in labor relations